Teatro Villanueva (or the Villanueva Theatre) was a theatre in colonial Havana. Located on Calle Morro, it was inaugurated in February 1847 under the name Circo Habanero. The circular structure was built of wood and had a reported capacity of 4000. It was mainly used for bufo performances. Renovations were carried out in 1853, when the theatre was renamed Teatro Villanueva. The owner was one Miguel Nin y Pons, a protégé of the Count of Villanueva, Claudio Martínez de Pinillos. 

The theatre has a special pace in the lore of Cuban independence from Spain. On 22nd January 1869, auxiliary military forces consisting of Spanish criollos (also known as the Volunteer Corps) opened fire on theatre attendees. This came to be known as the Events of the Villanueva Theater (Sucesos del Teatro Villanueva). The teenager José Martí and his teacher Rafael María de Mendive were reportedly in the vicinity; soon after, Martí released his revolutionary poem Abdala.

To this day, the Sucesos are commemorated in Cuba, and 22nd January is designated as Cuban Theatre Day. 

Following the Sucesos, the theatre closed down, later becoming the site of a tenement house.

References

History of Cuba
Theatres
Cuban culture